Media.link Communications Company Limited is a Maltese mass media company owned by the Nationalist Party. Its operations include NET Television, Radio 101, and the In-Nazzjon and Il-Mument newspapers.

It also previously operated the online newspaper MaltaRightNow.com (rebranded to NET News), publishing company PIN Publications, and mobile virtual network operator Ping Mobile (active 2012-2013). The online newspaper was subsequently changed to the website netnews.com.mt.

See also 
 One Productions, counterpart media company owned by the Labour Party

References

Mass media companies of Malta
Political mass media in Malta
Nationalist Party (Malta)